The Little Madawaska River is a river in the Saint Lawrence River drainage basin in the Unorganized South Part of Nipissing District in northeastern Ontario, Canada. The river is entirely within Algonquin Provincial Park, and is a right tributary of the Petawawa River and not a tributary of the nearby Madawaska River.

Course
The river begins at Lake La Muir in the geographic township Freswick Township and flows northeast to Hogan Lake. It continues northeast from the lake controlled by a small dam to Phillip Lake, from which it also continues to flow northeast controlled by a dam. The river then empties into Radiant Lake on the Petawawa River in Deacon Township, near the unincorporated place of Odenback. The Petawawa flows via the Ottawa River to the Saint Lawrence River.

Tributaries
Owenee Creek (left)
Oldcamp Creek (right)
Charles Creek (right)
Philip Lake
Grizzly Creek (right)
Cinderella Creek (left)
Hogan Lake
Hemlock Creek (right)
Lake La Muir
Grosbeak Creek

See also
List of rivers of Ontario

References

Sources

Rivers of Nipissing District
Tributaries of the Ottawa River